Keeton may refer to:

 Keeton, motor company
 Keeton (surname)
 Keeton v. Hustler Magazine, Inc., 1984 case